Shihāb al-Dīn Aḥmad ibn Ḥasan ibn ‘Ajlān al-Ḥasanī was co-Emir of Mecca from 1408 to 1416 alongside his father Hasan ibn Ajlan and his brother Barakat ibn Hasan .

In Muharram 821 AH (February 1418) Sharif Hasan sent gifts to the Mamluk Sultan al-Nasir Faraj and requested the appointment of Ahmad as co-Emir of Mecca with his brother Barakat. Al-Nasir granted his request and issued a decree to that effect in mid-Rabi al-Awwal 821 AH (August 1408). The decree reached Mecca with robes of honor for the three sharifs in the second half of Rabi al-Thani (September 1408).

On 14 Safar 818 AH (c. 25 April 1415) Sultan al-Mu'ayyad Shaykh issued a decree deposing Hasan and his sons in favor of Rumaythah ibn Muhammad. The du'a and khutbah in Mecca continued in the name of Hasan and his sons until they departed for Yemen at the start of Dhu al-Hijjah (c. 1 February 1416).

Ahmad returned to Mecca with his father in Shawwal 819 AH (December 1416) after Hasan was reinstated as Emir. After Hasan passed control of the Emirate to Barakat in Rabi al-Awwal 821 AH (April/May 1418), Ahmad rebelled and left Mecca. He died in early 842 AH (1438) in Zabid, Yemen and was buried there.

Notes

References

Sharifs of Mecca
Banu Qatadah
1438 deaths
15th-century Arabs